Paul L. Reiber (born June 20, 1947) is the Chief Justice of the Vermont Supreme Court. Reiber graduated from Hampden-Sydney College in 1970 and from Suffolk University Law School in Boston, Massachusetts in 1974. Reiber was in private practice in Rutland until becoming a partner in Kenlan, Schwiebert & Facey in 1986. He also served for six years on Vermont's Judicial Nominating Board.  He was appointed by Governor Jim Douglas as an associate justice in October 2003. Governor Douglas swore him in as chief justice on December 17, 2004.

References

External links
 Article on Chief Justice Reiber at Hampden-Sydney College's website

1947 births
21st-century American judges
Chief Justices of the Vermont Supreme Court
Hampden–Sydney College alumni
Living people
Politicians from Pittsburgh
Suffolk University Law School alumni
Vermont lawyers